Senator Gibbs may refer to:

Bob Gibbs (born 1954), Ohio State Senate
Dan Gibbs (born 1970s), Colorado State Senate
Frederick S. Gibbs (1845–1903), New York State Senate
June Gibbs (1922–2012), Rhode Island State Senate
Leonard W. H. Gibbs (1875–1930), New York State Senate